The 2021 Charlotte Edwards Cup, initially named the 2021 Women's Regional T20, was the first edition of the Charlotte Edwards Cup, an English women's cricket Twenty20 domestic competition took place between 26 June and 5 September 2021. It featured eight teams playing in two double round-robin groups, followed by a Finals Day. South East Stars won the tournament, beating Northern Diamonds in the final. The tournament ran alongside the Rachael Heyhoe Flint Trophy.

Background and format
With the ending of the Women's Cricket Super League in 2019, the England and Wales Cricket Board intended to launch a new regional structure for domestic women's cricket in England and Wales, including a 50-over competition, a Twenty20 competition and The Hundred. As the 2020 season was shortened due to the COVID-19 pandemic, the new Twenty20 competition was postponed, with only the Rachael Heyhoe Flint Trophy taking place. In February 2021, it was announced that the competition would begin that year, as the Women's Regional T20. In June 2021, the tournament was renamed the Charlotte Edwards Cup. Fixtures were played in two blocks, after the first half of the 2021 Rachael Heyhoe Flint Trophy and with a break in the middle for The Hundred.

The competition featured eight teams that represent regional hubs. Teams were divided into two groups, based on finishing positions in the 2020 Rachael Heyhoe Flint Trophy, and played each team in their group twice, home and away, with the two group winners and the best second-place team advancing to Finals Day. The best group winner advanced straight to the Final, whilst the other two teams played off in a semi-final.

Teams
The teams were as follows:
 Central Sparks (representing Warwickshire, Worcestershire, Herefordshire, Shropshire and Staffordshire)
 Lightning (representing Loughborough University, Derbyshire, Leicestershire, Nottinghamshire and Lincolnshire)
 Northern Diamonds (representing Yorkshire, Durham and Northumberland)
 North West Thunder (representing Lancashire, Cheshire and Cumbria)
 South East Stars (representing Surrey and Kent)
 Southern Vipers (representing Hampshire, Sussex, Berkshire, Buckinghamshire, Dorset, Isle of Wight and Oxfordshire)
 Sunrisers  (representing Middlesex, Essex, Northamptonshire, Bedfordshire, Cambridgeshire, Hertfordshire, Huntingdonshire, Norfolk and Suffolk)
 Western Storm (representing Glamorgan, Gloucestershire, Somerset, Cornwall, Devon, Wiltshire and Cricket Wales)

Standings
Teams receive 4 points for a win. A bonus point will be given where the winning team's run rate is 1.25 or greater times that of the opposition. In case of a tie in the standings, the following tiebreakers will be applied in order: highest net run rate, team that scored the most points in matches involving the tied parties, better bowling strike rate, drawing of lots.

Group A

Group B 

 advanced to the final
 advanced to the semi-final

Group stage

Group A
Source:

Group B
Source:

Finals Day

Semi-final

Final

Statistics
Highest score by a team: North West Thunder – 186/1 (20 overs) v Sunrisers (9 July).
 Top score by an individual: Emma Lamb – 111* (61) v Sunrisers (9 July).
 Best bowling figures by an individual: Charlie Dean – 5/19 (3.5 overs) v Central Sparks (26 June).

Most runs

Source: ESPNCricinfo

Most wickets

Source: ESPNCricinfo

References

External links
 Series home at ESPN Cricinfo

 Charlotte Edwards Cup
2021 in English women's cricket